The Texas Trail Hall of Fame is a cowboy hall of fame in Fort Worth, Texas. Established in 1997, the building is located at 208 N.W. 24th Street, in the Fort Worth Stockyards National Historic District of the city.

The hall honors individuals who have contributed to the Western way of life. Bronze markers have been installed for each inductee. The markers are designed to resemble a frontier marshal's badge and each is inscribed with an inductee's name. New inductees are honored annually during ceremonies at the Red Steagall Cowboy Gathering and Western Swing Festival.

Inductees
Source:

1990s

1997
J. Frank Dobie
Will Rogers
Roy Rogers
Sid Richardson
Bill Pickett
Quanah Parker
Jose Antonio Navarro
Watt Matthews
Tad Lucas
Oliver Loving
 John Justin, Jr.
Bose Ikard
Charles Goodnight
Dale Evans
Amon G. Carter, Sr.
Burk Burnett

1998
Bob Wills
 Major Khleber M. Van Zandt
 Colonel Christopher C. Slaughter
Juan Seguin
George W. Saunders
Frederic Remington
Annie Oakley
Richard King
Sam Houston
Zane Grey
Gene Autry
Stephen F. Austin

1999
Sue McCafferty
Charlie McCafferty
John Ware
 W. T. Waggoner
Red Steagall
Windy Ryon
Charles M. Russell
Theodore Roosevelt
Ruth Roach
Steve Murrin
Pawnee Bill Lillie
Robert Kleberg, Sr.
Holt Hickman
 Charles French
David Crockett
Samuel Colt
Buffalo Bill Cody
Jesse Chisholm
Dolph Briscoe

2000s

2000
Lewis and Clark
Ernest Tubb
Erastus “Deaf” Smith
Sacagawea
Nat Love
Elmer Kelton
Will James
John Coffee “Jack” Hays
Amanda Burk
James Bowie
James Beckwourth

2001
Yakima Canutt
William Barrett Travis
Edward Tarrant
Sons of the Pioneers
Luke Short
Bat Masterson
Jane Long
Herb Jeffries
John Ford
Wyatt Earp
Lorenzo DeZavala
Kit Carson

2002
Jay Silverheels
Lawrence Sullivan “Sul” Ross
Maurice W. “Tex” Ritter
Clayton Moore
John O. Meusebach
M. L. Leddy
Claudia “Lady Bird” Johnson
James Butler “Wild Bill” Hickok
Jim Courtright
Martha “Calamity Jane” Canary
Roy Bean
Major Ripley Arnold

2003
Jim Shoulders
Cynthia Ann Parker
Bob Moorhouse
Tom Mix
Miller Brothers 101 Ranch
Louis L’Amour
Britt Johnson
Ben Johnson
Susannah Dickinson
William S. Davis

2004
Jim Wright
 Leon White
John Wayne
 W. R. “Billy Bob” Watt
 Old Blue
Audie Murphy
Enid Justin
John Graves
 Jerry Diaz
Chief Joseph

2005
Peta Nocona
William “Bigfoot” Wallace
Mitzi Lucas Riley
Larry Mahan
 Jim Lane
Cleo Hearn
Julian Field
George “Press” Farmer

2006
Hank Thompson
H. Allen Short
Tom Bailey Saunders, IV
Midnight
Charles McFarland
Don Edwards
E. M. Daggett
John Butterfield

2007
Daniel Webster Wallace
Gustavus Franklin Swift
John Peter Smith
 Samuel “Booger Red” Privett, Jr.
Garlene Tindall Parris
Chris LeDoux
Adina Emilia De Zavala
Mark Twain
 General Edward Burleson
Catherine Bryant Arnold

2008
Buck Taylor
William Wallace Simpson
Randolph Scott
Larry McMurtry
Mirabeau Lamar
George Glenn
Clara Driscoll
American Buffalo

2009
Oliver Winchester
 The Vaquero
John Batterson Stetson
Nolan Ryan
Lily Langtry
Joseph Glidden
Henry O. Flipper
Jack Favor
John Chisum

2010s

2010
Casey Duane Tibbs
 Dean Smith
Middleton Tate Johnson
Johnny Gimble
Neal Gay
Commission Companies
Choctaw Code Talkers
Lynn Anderson

2011
Leon Rausch
Pam Minick
Billy Minick
Joseph McCoy
Phil Lyne
Quail Dobbs
Henrietta Chamberlain King
Superior Livestock Auction
Texas Sesquicentennial Wagon Train
Texas Declaration of Independence
Anson Jones

2012
Robert “Butch Cassidy” Parker
Buckley Burton Paddock
Bobbie Nelson
Willie Nelson
Harry “Sundance Kid” Longabaugh
Lyndon Baines Johnson
Temple Grandin
Trevor Brazile
Philip Danforth Armour
Old Trail Drivers

2013
 Gen. William J. Worth
Tumbleweed Smith
Simon Farrar
Set-T’ainte (Satanta)
Rudy Warner Robbins
Leon Coffee
John Avery Lomax
Perry Bass and Nancy Lee Bass
Jim Thorpe
Bass Reeves

2014
“Stagecoach Mary” Fields
Pastor Christer Segerliv
William “Billy” Dixon
Mabel Strickland
Lawrence Steel
Joe Dulle
 James Farmer
Horace Greeley
Comanche Code Talkers
Ben Tahmahkera
Ben King “Doc” Green

2015
Joseph Sterling Bridwell – Oil Man
Graham H. Childress – Rancher
Cabeza De Vaca – Explorer
Five Civilized Tribes – Indian Confederation
Fort Worth Stock Show & Rodeo
Fountain Goodlet Oxsheer – Rancher
James Hampton – Actor
Stylle Reed – Artist
Bob Simpson – Preservationist

2016
John Barclay Armstrong
Choctaw Code Talkers
Great American Cattle Drive
Francis Augustus Hamer
Loyd Jinkens
Leander Harvey McNelly
North Fort Worth Historical Society
Vicente Oropeza
 Mary D & F. Howard Walsh Sr
Cathy Williams

2017
Billy Bob Barnett
Margaret Borland
Wilson Franklin
Johnny Fry
Bruce Greene
Donald Jury
W. O. Rominger
Eddie Sandoval
Clint Walker

2018
Robert Fuller
Barry Corbin
Douglas Harman
Granville T. Woods
Jeanette Sterns Keim (Jean Marlowe)
Plenty Coups
S. Omar Barker
Benjamin Tyler Henry
H.B. Baker (H.B. “Hub” Baker)

2019
James Arness
Marty Robbins
John Smith
Black Kettle
Chuck DeHaan
Mathew Caldwell
True West Magazine
Clay O'Brien Cooper
James Drury

2020s

2022
Robert Duvall
Sam Elliott
Geronimo
Rebecca Tyler Lockhart
Texas Rangers
Jimmy Riscky
Mollie Taylor Stevenson Jr. and Sr.
Buster Welch
William “Bill” Wittliff

2021
David William Beautiful Bald Eagle
John “Pete” Bonds
Fort Worth Herd
Lawson Daniel Gratz (Gratts)
Keith Maddox
Michael Martin Murphey
Fess Parker
George Strait
Western Horseman Magazine
George Westby

See also
List of museums in North Texas
National Cowboy and Western Heritage Museum in Oklahoma

References

External links 
 Official Website

1990 establishments in Texas
Cowboy halls of fame
Halls of fame in Texas
Sports halls of fame
Sports hall of fame inductees
Awards established in 1990
Museums established in 1990
Lists of sports awards